Polar Times Glacier is a glacier on Ingrid Christensen Coast, flowing northward between Svarthausen Nunatak and Boyd Nunatak into the western part of Publications Ice Shelf. It was delineated by John H. Roscoe from aerial photographs taken by USN Operation Highjump, 1946–1947, and named by Roscoe after The Polar Times, a polar journal published by the American Polar Society, New York City.

See also
 List of glaciers in the Antarctic
 Glaciology

References
 

American Polar Society
Glaciers of Ingrid Christensen Coast